Gerald "Jerry" Wilson (7 August 1906 – 10 June 1945) was a sailor from Canada, who represented his country at the 1932 Summer Olympics in Los Angeles, US.

References

 

Canadian male sailors (sport)
Sailors at the 1932 Summer Olympics – 6 Metre
Olympic sailors of Canada
Olympic bronze medalists for Canada
1906 births
1945 deaths